Gerhard Hölzl (born 17 April 1952 in Regensburg) is a German former diver who competed in the 1972 Summer Olympics.

References

1952 births
Living people
German male divers
Olympic divers of West Germany
Divers at the 1972 Summer Olympics
Sportspeople from Regensburg
20th-century German people